The Queen's Park Oval is a cricket ground in Port of Spain, Trinidad and Tobago. With a capacity of 25,000 it is the largest ground in the West Indies. 59 Test matches have been played at the ground, the first of these was in 1930 when the West Indies played the touring England team. 65 One Day Internationals (ODIs) have also been played at the Queen's Park Oval. The first ODI at the ground was played between the West Indies and India. Additionally, the ground hosted three World Series Cricket one-day games and a Supertest between the WSC West Indies and WSC Australian teams.

The Englishman Patsy Hendren was the first player to score a Test century at the ground. Hendren's innings of 205 not out was made in 1930 against the West Indies, it is one of only 6 double centuries scored at the ground. The Indian Sunil Gavaskar's innings of 220, made against the West Indies in 1971, remains the highest individual score at the Queen's Park Oval. Sunil Gavaskar is also the only overseas player to have scored four Test centuries at the ground, the others are Everton Weekes, Rohan Kanhai and Alvin Kallicharran. Everton Weekes's 207, made against India in 1953, is the highest individual innings by a West Indian at the ground.

The first of seventeen ODI centuries made at the Queen's Park Oval was scored by the Englishman Graham Gooch in 1986, his innings of 129 came from 118 deliveries. Brian Lara holds the record for highest individual ODI score at the ground, his innings of 146 not out from 132 deliveries was made against New Zealand in 1996. India's Virat Kohli is the only player to have scored three ODI centuries at the ground.

Key
 * denotes that the batsman was not out.
 Inns. denotes the number of the innings in the match.
 Balls denotes the number of balls faced in an innings.
 NR denotes that the number of balls was not recorded.
 Parentheses next to the player's score denotes his century number at the Queen's Park Oval.
 The column title Date refers to the date the match started.
 The column title Result refers to whether the player's team won, lost or if the match was drawn or a no result.

Test centuries

The following table summarises the Test centuries scored at the Queen's Park Oval.

One Day International centuries

The following table summarises the One Day International centuries scored at the Queen's Park Oval.

World Series Cricket centuries
The following table summarises the WSC centuries scored at the Queen's Park Oval.

References 

Queen's Park
Cricket grounds in Trinidad and Tobago
Centuries